Ezzat El Alaili (15 September 1934 – 5 February 2021) was an Egyptian actor who starred in over 300 films, TV series, and theatre plays since the 1960s. He had his bachelor's degree from the Higher Institute of Theatre Studies in 1960.

Awards
He won a lifetime achievement award from the Dubai International Film Festival in 2015. He was also honored at the Sharjah International Book Fair "for his significant contribution to Egyptian cinema over many decades and his highly creative interpretations of the best Egyptian and Arabic novels through a huge collection of films and TV series".

Selected filmography

Ressalah min emraa maghoula (1962) - Doctor
Cairo (1963) - Third Officer
 (1964)
El rajul el maghul (1965)
El jassus (1965)
The Land (1970) - Abd El-Hadi
Al-ikhtiyar (1971)
The Game of Each Day (1971)
Al-Nass wal Nil (1972) - Amin
Bint badia (1972)
Ghoroba''' (1973)Kuwait Connection (1973) - AnwarA Story of Tutankhamun (1973) - AhmedAl-abriaa (1974) - MamdouhZaier el-fager (1975) - Hassan Al WakilZat al Wajhein (1975) - WaelAla mn notlik Al-Rosas (1975) - Adel
 (1975)Beyrouth ya Beyrouth (1975)Al-saqqa mat (1977)Ayb Ya Lulu ... Ya Lulu Ayb (1978) - KamalAlexandria... Why? (1979) - Shaker
 (1979) - HamdiAl Qadisiyya (1981) - SaadPeople on the Top (1981) - Mohamed FawziTabûnat al-sayyid Fabre (1983)Al-Majhoul (1984) - NajiAl Ens Wa Al Jinn (1985) - OsamaEl-Toot wel Nabboot (1986) - Ashour survivorEl Towk Wa El Eswera (1986) - Bakhet / MoustafaLa Todamerni Maak (1986) - FaresEl Waratha (1986) - AhmedAl sabr fi al-malahat (1986)Daqat Zar (1986) - MassoudBe'r El-khiana (1987) - Officer / Nader LashinWell of Treason (1987)El Motarda Al Akhira (1987)Aad liyantaqim (1988) - HashimAl Hubb Aydan Yamoot (1988) - MoradBostan El Dam (1988)El Mealema Samah (1989) - KamalLela Assal (1990) - HussienWar in the Land of Egypt (1991)El-Fas fi el-Ras (1992) - Nagawi el-MarkabiLa dame du Caire (1992)Road to Eilat (1994) - Colonel RadiLa Taktolou El-Hob (2001)Turab el Mass (2018) - Mahrous BergasQaed A'aely'' (2019)

References

External links
 

1934 births
2021 deaths
Male actors from Cairo
Egyptian male film actors
Egyptian male stage actors
Egyptian male television actors
20th-century Egyptian male actors
21st-century Egyptian male actors